Caravaggio, il pittore maledetto is a 1941 Italian historical drama film directed by Goffredo Alessandrini and starring Amedeo Nazzari, Clara Calamai and Lamberto Picasso. Nazzari portrays the painter Caravaggio as a wayward genius. It was one of his favourite screen roles.

Main cast
 Amedeo Nazzari as Michelangelo Merisi, il "Caravaggio"  
 Clara Calamai as Madonna Giaconella  
 Lamberto Picasso as Il cavalier d'Arpino  
 Nino Crisman as Alef di Wignacourt  
 Lauro Gazzolo as Zio Nello  
 Beatrice Mancini as Lena 
 Olinto Cristina as Il cardinale Dal Monte  
 Maria Dominiani as Alessandra  
 Achille Majeroni as Il cardinale Scipione Borghese  
 Renato Malavasi as Mauro

Production
Screenwriter Riccardo Freda met Francesco Curato and parter of his Carbone, who were trying to produce a film on the Italian painter Caravaggio. The budget of the film became higher and higher. It was shot in 1940 and was released the following year, making it the first film from Elica Film. Freda is credited in the film as having "collaborated to the making of the film." Besides working on the screenplay, Freda acted as the executive producer and worked on the art direction and created a maquette of the port of Ostia.

The film starred Amedeo Nazzari was among Italy's most popular actors at the time and was conflicted with the role when his character Caravaggio did not embrace or kiss any woman in the film, which he thought would put his career at risk.

Release
Caravaggio, il pittore maledetto was distributed theatrically in Italy by Minerva Film on 6 February 1941.

References

Bibliography

External links 
 

1941 films
Italian historical drama films
Italian black-and-white films
1940s historical drama films
1940s Italian-language films
Films directed by Goffredo Alessandrini
Films set in the 16th century
Films set in the 1600s
Films set in the 1610s
Caravaggio
Films set in Italy
Biographical films about painters
Italian biographical drama films
1940s biographical drama films
Minerva Film films
Cultural depictions of 17th-century painters
Cultural depictions of Italian men
1940s Italian films